Nicholas Martinez, Nicolás Martínez, or Nick Martinez may refer to:

 Nick Martinez (baseball) (born 1990), American professional baseball player
 Nicolás Martínez (footballer, born 1984), Argentine defender
 Nicolás Martínez (footballer, born 1986), Argentine defender
 Nicolás Martínez (footballer, born 1987), Argentine midfielder
 Nicolás Martínez (footballer, born 1989), Paraguayan forward
 Nicolás Martínez (footballer, born 1991), Argentine forward
 Nicolás Martínez (footballer, born 1992), Argentine forward
 Nicolás Martínez (footballer, born 1997), Uruguayan defender
 Nicolás Martínez (footballer, born 1998), Uruguayan goalkeeper